The Da Pedra River is a river of Santa Catarina state in southeastern Brazil. It joins with the Amola-Faca River to form the Itoupava River.

See also
List of rivers of Santa Catarina

References

Rivers of Santa Catarina (state)